= Wesson, Virginia =

Unincorporated community in Virginia, United States

Coordinates: 36°45′37″N 77°51′54″W

Wesson is an unincorporated community located in Brunswick County, in the U.S. state of Virginia.
